The women's 400 metres hurdles event at the 1994 European Athletics Championships was held in Helsinki, Finland, at Helsinki Olympic Stadium on 9 and 10 August 1994.

Medalists

Results

Final
10 August

Semi-finals
10 August

Semi-final 1

Semi-final 2

Heats
9 August

Heat 1

Heat 2

Heat 3

Participation
According to an unofficial count, 24 athletes from 15 countries participated in the event.

 (1)
 (1)
 (1)
 (1)
 (1)
 (3)
 (1)
 (1)
 (2)
 (1)
 (3)
 (2)
 (2)
 (1)
 (3)

References

400 metres hurdles
400 metres hurdles at the European Athletics Championships
1994 in women's athletics